Shotor Khvar (also Romanized as Shotor Khvār and Shotor Khār) is a village in Vahnabad Rural District of the Central District of Robat Karim County, Tehran province, Iran. At the 2006 National Census, its population was 2,567 in 632 households. The following census in 2011 counted 4,455 people in 1,219 households. The latest census in 2016 showed a population of 5,360 people in 1,627 households; it was the largest village in its rural district.

References 

Robat Karim County

Populated places in Tehran Province

Populated places in Robat Karim County